Petrópolis Medical School - Arthur Sá Earp Neto Faculty (Faculdade de Medicina de Petrópolis - Faculdade Arthur Sá Earp Neto in Portuguese), best known as FMP or FASE, is a private institution of higher education and research on health sciences located in Petrópolis, Brazil. Founded in 1967, FMP has today 10 degrees: Medicine, Nursing, Dentistry, Nutrition, Psychology, Radiology, Administration, Human Resources, Environmental Management and Public Administration.

References

External links
 Official website (Portuguese)

Medical schools in Brazil
Universities and colleges in Rio de Janeiro (state)
Petrópolis
Private universities and colleges in Brazil